Miss Earth United States 2015 was the 11th edition of Miss Earth United States pageant that was held at Colony Performing Arts Theater. Andrea Neu of Colorado crowned Brittany Ann Payne of California as Miss Earth United States 2015 at the end of the event. She was the USA's representative in the Miss Earth 2015 competition and placed second runner-up, earning the elemental title of Miss Earth Water 2015.

References

External links
 

Earth United States
July 2015 events in the United States
2015 in California
Miss Earth United States
Beauty pageants in the United States